Norwich Airport may refer to:

 Norwich Airport in Norwich, Norfolk, England
RAF Horsham St Faith, the military airport which existed on the site of Norwich Airport prior to 1963
 Norwich Lt. Warren Eaton Airport in Norwich, New York, United States
 Norwich Airport (Kansas) in Norwich, Kansas, United States